Statistics of Guam League in the 1996 season.

Overview
G-Force won the championship.

References
RSSSF

Guam Soccer League seasons
Guam
Guam
football